Malaysia's Next Top Model is a fashion-themed reality television show produced and broadcast in Malaysia. It is the Malaysian version of the international Top Model franchise.

Malaysia's Next Top Model cycle 1, also known as Estee Lauder Model Search - Malaysia was held around the middle of 2007. The show featured 10 finalists:
 Wan Noraishah Binti Samsudin 
 Samantha Yen Yee Tan 
 Sallie Suharly
 Adreana Zulkifli
 Marlini Bt. Che Mat Din
 Robyna Melissa How Mei Wan
 Chiang Lee Ming
 Florinda Johnson
 Celine Tan
 Deena Katrina Bte Dato Marzuki

Malaysia's Next Top Model cycle 2, also known as Estee Lauder Model Search - Malaysia was held around the middle of 2008. The show featured 10 finalists:
Carishiela Kuijpers 
Sandra Yap Sze Hwui 
Teresa Zhang
Jo-Anna Sue Henley-Rampas
Siti Nurnabiha Badjenid
Janet Bennet 
Amal Alkaff 
Putri Sarah Muna Friedli 
Jaslinder Kaur  
Michelle Yeoh Hui Fang

Malaysia's Next Top Model cycle 3, also known as Estee Lauder Model Search - Malaysia was held around the middle of 2009. The show featured 12 finalists:
Jennifer Pedersen
Juanita Francis Jacob
Nur Izzati Abdul'as
Priscilla Daisy Collar
Priyanka Puri
Kok Xinyi
El Omar
Athena Francis Puglia
Soraya Khatijah Matthews
Lim Kah Ngee
Fransiska Almarhumah Luhong James
Shweta Shaiton Binti Muhyidin
2007 Malaysian television series debuts
2007 Malaysian television series endings